The NWA Florida Junior Heavyweight Championship was the top title for lighter wrestlers in the National Wrestling Alliance's Florida territory, Championship Wrestling from Florida. The title itself began in 1942, seven years before CWF was founded. The title was abandoned in 1984, before being revived by NWA Florida in 1997.

Title history

See also
Championship Wrestling from Florida
National Wrestling Alliance
NWA Florida X Division Championship
NWA North American Heavyweight Championship
NWA Florida Heavyweight Championship

Footnotes

References

Championship Wrestling from Florida championships
Junior heavyweight wrestling championships
National Wrestling Alliance championships
National Wrestling Alliance state wrestling championships